This is a complete list of members of the United States House of Representatives during the 6th United States Congress listed by seniority. For the most part, representatives are ranked by the beginning of their terms in office.

As an historical article, the districts and party affiliations listed reflect those during the 6th Congress (March 4, 1799 – March 3, 1801). Seats and party affiliations on similar lists for other Congresses will be different for certain members.

This article describes the criteria for seniority in the House of Representatives and sets out the list of members by seniority. It is prepared on the basis of the interpretation of seniority applied to the House of Representatives in the current congress. In the absence of information to the contrary, it is presumed that the twenty-first-century practice is identical to the seniority customs used during the 6th Congress.

House seniority
Seniority in the House, for Congressmen with unbroken service, depends on the date on which the members first term began. That date is either the start of the Congress (4 March in odd numbered years, for the era up to and including the 73rd Congress starting in 1933) or the date of a special election during the Congress. Since many members start serving on the same day as others, ranking between them is based on alphabetical order by the last name of the congressman.

Congressmen, in early Congresses, were often elected after the legal start of the Congress. Representatives are attributed with unbroken seniority, from the legal start of the congressional term, if they were the first person elected to a seat in a Congress. The date of the election is indicated in a note.

The seniority date is normally taken from the members entry in the Biographical Directory of the United States Congress, except where the date given is the legal start of the Congress and the actual election (for someone who was not the first person elected to the seat in that Congress) was later. The date of election is taken from United States Congressional Elections 1788-1997. In a few instances the latter work provides dates, for the start and end of terms, which correct those in the Biographical Directory.

The Biographical Directory normally uses the date of a special election, as the seniority date.  However, mostly in early Congresses, the date of the member taking his seat can be the one given. The date of the special election is mentioned in a note to the list below, when that date is not used as the seniority date by the Biographical Directory.

Representatives who returned to the House, after having previously served, are credited with service equal to one less than the total number of terms they served. When a representative has served a prior term of less than two terms (i.e., prior term minus one equals less than one), he is ranked above all others whose service begins on the same day.

Leadership
In this Congress, the only formal leader was the Speaker of the House. Two Speakership ballots were held on December 2, 1799, and Theodore Sedgwick (F-MA) was elected.

Standing committees
The House created its first standing committee, on April 13, 1789. There were four standing committees, listed in the rules of the 6th Congress. In addition there was a Ways and Means Committee. Although the Ways and Means Committee was not formally added to the main list of standing committees until 1802, the 2011 committee considers it to be a forerunner.

Committees, in this period, were appointed for a session at a time and not necessarily for every one in a Congress. The Speaker appointed the members.

This list refers to the standing committees of the House in the 6th Congress, the year of establishment as a standing committee, the number of members assigned to the committee and the dates of appointment in each session, the end of the session and its chairman. Chairmen, who were re-appointed after serving in the previous Congress, are indicated by an *.

List of representatives by seniority
A numerical rank is assigned to each of the 106 members initially elected to the 6th Congress. Other members, who were not the first person elected to a seat but who joined the House during the Congress, are not assigned a number.

Four Representatives-elect were not sworn in, as two died and two resigned. The list below includes the Representatives-elect (with name in italics), with the seniority they would have held if they had been sworn in.

Party designations used in this article are DR for Democratic-Republican members and F for Federalist representatives. Designations used for service in the first three congresses are (A) for Anti-Administration members and (P) for Pro-Administration representatives.

{|class="wikitable"
|+U.S. House seniority'|- valign=bottom
!Rank!!Representative!!Party!!District!!Seniority date!!Notes
|- 
|colspan="6"| Six consecutive terms|-
|1||Thomas Hartley|||F||||rowspan=3||| (P) 1789–95. Died December 21, 1800, while still serving as a member of the House.
|-
|2||Josiah Parker|||F|||| (A) 1789–93; (P) 1793–95. Elected to this Congress:April 24, 1799. Last term while serving as a member of the House.
|-
|3||George Thatcher|||F|||| (P) 1789–95. Last term while serving as a member of the House. (elected to 7th Congress but not sworn in).
|-
|colspan="6"| Five consecutive terms|-
|4||Andrew Gregg|||DR||||rowspan=4||| (A) 1791-95
|-
|5||William B. Grove|||F|||| (P) 1791-95
|-
|6||John W. Kittera|||F|| || (P) 1791–95. Last term while serving as a member of the House.
|-
|7||Nathaniel Macon|||DR|||| (A) 1791–95. Chairman: Claims (1800–01).
|-
|colspan="6"| Five non-consecutive terms|-
|8||Theodore Sedgwick|||F|||||| Previously served (P) 1789-95 and (F) 1795-June 1796.Speaker of the House. Last term while serving as a member of the House.
|-
|colspan="6"| Four consecutive terms|-
|9||George Dent|||F||||rowspan=8||| (P) 1793–95. Chairman: Elections (1800–01). Last term while serving as a member of the House.
|-
|10||Dwight Foster|||F|||| (P) 1793–95. Chairman: Claims (1799–1800). Resigned on June 6, 1800, while still serving as a member of the House.
|-
|11||Henry Glen|||F|||| (P) 1793–95. Last term while serving as a member of the House.
|-
|12||Anthony New|||DR|||| (A) 1793–95. Elected to this Congress: April 24, 1799.
|-
|13||John Nicholas|||DR|||| (A) 1793–95. Elected to this Congress: April 24, 1799. Last term while serving as a member of the House.
|-
|14||Samuel Smith|||DR|||| (A) 1793–95. Chairman: Commerce and Manufactures.
|-
|15||Philip Van Cortlandt|||DR|||| (A) 1793-95
|-
|16||Peleg Wadsworth|||F|||| (P) 1793-95
|-
|17||Robert G. Harper|||F|||||| (P) February 9-March 3, 1795. Chairman: Ways and Means(1799–1800). Last term while serving as a member of the House.
|-
|colspan="6"| Four non-consecutive terms|-
|18||Thomas Sumter|||DR|||||| Previously served (A) 1789-93 while as a member of the House.
|-
|19||Abiel Foster|||F|| NH-al|||| Previously served (P) June 22, 1789–91 while as a member of the House.
|-
|20||Aaron Kitchell|||DR|||||| Previously served (P) 1791-93 and January 29 – March 3, 1795;(F) 1795-97 while as a member of the House. Last term while serving as a member of the House.
|-
|colspan="6"| Three consecutive terms|-
|21||Samuel J. Cabell|||DR||||rowspan=10||| Elected to this Congress: April 24, 1799
|-
|22||Albert Gallatin|||DR|||| Last term while serving as a member of the House (elected to 7th Congress but not sworn in)
|-
|23||Chauncey Goodrich|||F||CT-al|| Last term while serving as member of the House.
|-
|24||Roger Griswold|||F||CT-al|| Chairman: Revisal and Unfinished Business (1799–1800).Chairman: Ways and Means (1800–01).
|-
|25||Jonathan N. Havens|||DR|||| Died, as Representative-elect: October 25, 1799
|-
|26||Edward Livingston|||DR|||| Last term while serving as a member of the House until 18th Congress
|-
|27||Samuel Lyman|||F|||| Resigned on November 6, 1800, while serving as a member of the House.
|-
|28||John Reed Sr.|||F||||rowspan=2| Last term while serving as a member of the House.
|-
|29||Richard Thomas|||F||
|-
|30||Joseph B. Varnum|||DR|||| 
|-
|31||William Craik|||F|||||| Last term while serving as a member of the House.
|-
|32||Samuel Sewall|||F|||||| Resigned on January 10, 1800, while serving as a member of the House.
|-
|33||Samuel W. Dana|||F||CT-al|||| Chairman: Elections (1799–1800)
|-
|colspan="6"| Three non-consecutive terms|-
|34||Theodorus Bailey|||DR||||rowspan=4||| Previously served (A) 1793-95 and (DR) 1795–97. Last term while serving as a member of the House until seated in the 7th Congress.
|-
|35||Gabriel Christie|||DR|||| Previously served (A) 1793-95 and (DR) 1795-97 while as a member of the House. Last term while serving as a member of the House.
|- 
|36||Peter Muhlenberg|||DR|||| Previously served (A) 1789-91 and 1793-95 while as a member of the House. Last term while serving as a member of the House (elected to 7th Congress but not sworn in)
|-
|37||Joshua Seney|||DR|||| Previously served (A) 1789-92 while as a member of the House. Died, as Representative-elect:October 20, 1798.
|-
|colspan="6"| Two consecutive terms|-
|38||George Baer, Jr.|||F||||rowspan=23||| Last term while serving as a member of the House until 14th Congress
|-
|39||James A. Bayard|||F||DE-al|| 
|-
|40||Christopher G. Champlin|||F||RI-al|| Last term while serving as a member of the House.
|-
|41||Matthew Clay|||DR|||| Elected to this Congress: April 24, 1799
|-
|42||Thomas T. Davis|||DR|||| Elected to this Congress: May 7, 1799
|-
|43||John Dawson|||DR|||| Elected to this Congress: April 24, 1799
|-
|44||John Dennis|||F||||rowspan=2|
|-
|45||Lucas C. Elmendorf|||DR|| 
|-
|46||Thomas Evans|||F|||| Elected to this Congress: April 24, 1799. Last term while serving as a member of the House.
|-
|47||John Fowler|||DR|||| Elected to this Congress: May 7, 1799
|-
|48||Jonathan Freeman|||F||NH-al|| Last term while serving as a member of the House.
|-
|49||William Gordon|||F||NH-al|| Resigned on June 12, 1800, while still serving as a member of the House.
|-
|50||John A. Hanna|||DR|||| 
|-
|51||David Holmes|||DR|||| Elected to this Congress: April 24, 1799
|-
|52||James H. Imlay|||F|||| Last term while serving as a member of the House.
|-
|53||Matthew Lyon|||DR|||| Last term while serving as a member of the House until 8th Congress
|- 
|54||Harrison G. Otis|||F|||| Last term while serving as a member of the House.
|-
|55||John Rutledge, Jr.|||F||||rowspan=3| 
|-
|56||William Shepard|||F||
|-
|57||Richard Stanford|||DR|| 
|-
|58||Abram Trigg|||DR||||rowspan=2| Elected to this Congress: April 24, 1799
|-
|59||John J. Trigg|||DR||
|-
|60||Robert Williams|||DR|||| 
|-
|61||John Allen|||F||CT-al|||| Resigned, as Representative-elect: c. August 1799 
|-
|62||Lewis R. Morris|||F|||||| 
|-
|63||William Edmond|||F||CT-al|||| Last term while serving as a member of the House (elected to 7th Congress but not sworn in)
|-
|64||William Claiborne|||DR||TN-al||rowspan=2||| Elected to this Congress: August 1–2, 1799. Last term(elected to 7th Congress but not sworn in).
|-
|65||Thomas Pinckney|||F||||rowspan=2| Last term while serving as a member of the House.
|-
|66||Bailey Bartlett|||F||||
|-
|67||Peleg Sprague|||F||NH-al|||| Resigned, as Representative-elect: c. October 1799 
|-
|68||Joseph Hiester|||DR|||||| 
|-
|69||Jonathan Brace|||F||CT-al||rowspan=3||| Resigned 1800
|-
|70||Joseph Eggleston|||DR|||| Elected to this Congress: April 24, 1799. Last term while serving as a member of the House.
|-
|71||Robert Waln|||F|||| Last term while serving as a member of the House.
|-
|72||Robert Brown|||DR|||||| 
|-
|73||Richard D. Spaight|||DR|||||| Last term while serving as a member of the House.
|-
|colspan="6"| Two non-consecutive terms|-
|74||William Cooper|||F||||rowspan=3||| Previously served (F) 1795-97 while as a member of the House. Last term while serving as a member of the House.
|-
|75||George Jackson|||DR|||| Previously served (DR) 1795-97 while as a member of Elected to this Congress:April 24, 1799.
|-
|76||John Smilie|||DR|||| Previously served (A) 1793-95 while as a member of the House.
|- 
|colspan="6"| One term|-
|77||Willis Alston|||DR||||rowspan=31||| rowspan=2|
|-
|78||John Bird|||F||
|-
|79||Phanuel Bishop|||DR|||| Elected to this Congress: June 6, 1799
|-
|80||John Brown|||F||RI-al|| Only term while serving as a member of the House.
|-
|81||John Condit|||DR||||
|-
|82||Franklin Davenport|||F|||| Only term while serving as a member of the House.
|-
|83||John Davenport|||F||CT-al||
|-
|84||Joseph Dickson|||F|||| Only term while serving as a member of the House.
|-
|85||Samuel Goode|||DR||||rowspan=2| Elected to this Congress: April 24, 1799.
|-
|86||Edwin Gray|||DR||
|-
|87||Archibald Henderson|||F||||rowspan=3| 
|-
|88||William H. Hill|||F||
|-
|89||Benjamin Huger|||F||
|-
|90||James Jones|||F||GA-al|| Died on January 11, 1801, while still serving as a member of the House.
|-
|91||Henry Lee|||F|||| Elected to this Congress: April 24, 1799. Only term while serving as a member of the House.
|-
|92||Silas Lee|||F||||rowspan=2| 
|-
|93||Michael Leib|||DR||
|-
|94||James Linn|||DR|||| Only term while serving as a member of the House.
|-
|95||John Marshall|||F|||| Elected to this Congress: April 24, 1799. Resigned, to becomeSecretary of State: June 7, 1800.
|-
|...||Joseph H. Nicholson|||DR|||| Special election before start of term
|-
|96||Abraham Nott|||F|||| Only term while serving as a member of the House.
|-
|97||Robert Page|||F|||| Elected to this Congress: April 24, 1799. Only term while serving as a member of the House.
|-
|98||Jonas Platt|||F|||| Chairman: Revisal and Unfinished Business (1800–01). Only term while serving as a member of the House.
|-
|99||Leven Powell|||F|||| Elected to this Congress: April 24, 1799. Only term while serving as a member of the House.
|-
|100||John Randolph|||DR|||| Elected to this Congress: April 24, 1799
|-
|101||David Stone|||DR|||| Only term while serving as a member of the House (elected to 7th Congress but not sworn in)
|-
|102||Benjamin Taliaferro|||F||GA-al||
|-
|103||John C. Thomas|||F|||| Only term while serving as a member of the House.
|-
|104||John Thompson|||DR|||| Only term while serving as a member of the House until 10th Congress.
|-
|105||Lemuel Williams|||F|||| Elected to this Congress: August 29, 1799
|-
|106||Henry Woods|||F|||| 
|-
|colspan="6"| Members joining the House, after the start of the Congress|-
|...||Elizur Goodrich|||F||CT-al|||| Special election. Only term while serving as a member of the House. (elected to 7th Congress but did notserve).
|-
|...||James Sheafe|||F||NH-al|||| Special election. Only term while serving as a member of the House.
|-
|...||John Smith|||DR|||||| Special election: December 27–29, 1799 
|-
|...||John C. Smith|||F||CT-al|||| Special election: September 15, 1800
|-
|...||Samuel Tenney|||F||NH-al|||| Special election: October 27, 1800
|-
|...||Nathan Read|||F|||||| Special election: October 20, 1800
|-
|...||Littleton W. Tazewell|||DR|||||| Special election: July 31, 1800. Only term while serving as a member of the House.
|-
|...||Levi Lincoln|||DR||||||rowspan=2| Special election 
|-
|...||John Stewart|||DR||||
|-
|...||Ebenezer Mattoon|||F|||||| Special election: December 15, 1800 
|-
|colspan="6"| Non voting members|-
|a||William H. Harrison|||-||OH-al|||| Delegate for Northwest Territory (most population in future OH).Resigned to become Territorial Governor of IN: May 14, 1800.
|-
|b||William McMillan|||-||OH-al|||| Delegate for Northwest Territory (after July 4, 1800, only future OH).Special election.
|-
|}

See also
6th United States Congress
List of United States congressional districts
List of United States senators in the 6th Congress by seniority

References

 United States Congressional Elections 1788-1997'', by Michael J. Dubin (McFarland and Company 1998)

External links
House Journal, First Forty-three Sessions of Congress
House of Representatives list of members of the 6th Congress

6
6th United States Congress